Gabriel Clemens (born August 16, 1983) is a German professional darts player who plays in Professional Darts Corporation (PDC) events.

Career
In 2017, Clemens made the semi-finals of the World Masters, and missed match darts against the BDO number one Mark McGeeney to reach the final.

In January 2018, he gained a two-year PDC Tour Card. He won the fourth day of European Q-School by defeating the Dutchman Vincent Kamphuis 5–3 in the final. In his first year on the circuit, he reached the final of 2018 PDC Players Championship 11, where he took on two-time world champion Gary Anderson. Clemens missed two match-darts to win the title and lost 5–6.

In December 2020, he became the first German player to reach the round of Last 16 in the PDC World Darts Championship, after beating reigning champion Peter Wright 4–3.

Clemens reached the semi-final of the 2023 PDC World Darts Championship, becoming the first German player to reach that stage of the competition before suffering a 6–2 defeat to Michael Smith having already defeated world number one Gerwyn Price in the previous round.

World Championship results

PDC
 2019: Second round (lost to John Henderson 2–3)
 2020: First round (lost to Benito van de Pas 2–3)
 2021: Fourth round (lost to Krzysztof Ratajski 3–4)
 2022: Third round (lost to Jonny Clayton 0–4)
 2023: Semi-finals (lost to Michael Smith 2–6)

Performance timeline

BDO

PDC

PDC European Tour

Career finals

PDC world series finals: 1  (1 runner-up)

References

External links
Gabriel Clemens on Darts1.de (German)

{{#ifexpr:<21|}}

Living people
German darts players
Professional Darts Corporation current tour card holders
1983 births
PDC World Cup of Darts German team
People from Saarlouis
Sportspeople from Saarland